The Thanksgiving Play is a 2015 satirical comedy written by Larissa FastHorse. The play is developed in a linear way with interspersed informative moments in the performance to give the audience background knowledge on important events concerning Native Americans. In 2017, The Thanksgiving Play was selected by the Kilroys, an annual list of underproduced plays by women. In 2018, it was produced off-Broadway.

Production history 
Although The Thanksgiving Play is about Native American Month and Thanksgiving, it was originally written in an estate in the countryside of Ireland. Larissa FastHorse was awarded the Joe Dowling Annaghmakerrig Fellowship in 2015 from Joseph Haj at the Guthrie Theater in Minneapolis. Within this fellowship she could go to Tyrone Guthrie’s estate in Ireland, where she began writing the play. Having conceived and researched the idea in the USA, she wrote the first draft, in a mere ten days, while she was in the Irish countryside.

After its Irish beginnings, The Thanksgiving Play moved to U.C. Berkeley in 2015 for its first reading and a workshop. At Berkeley, it was directed by Paige Johnson and cast with students of the New Play Practicum.

The Thanksgiving Play then moved to Portland, Oregon at the Artists Repertory Theatre where a reading of it was done for the staff of the theatre.

After Portland, The Thanksgiving Play was a part of the fall Play Lab during the 2016/2017 season at Center Stage in Baltimore, Maryland. It was directed by Gavin Witt, who is also the Associate Director and Director of Dramaturgy at Center Stage. The play had its world premiere at Artists Repertory Theatre in their 2017/2018 season before moving to its Off-Broadway debut directed by Moritz von Stuelpnagel, at Playwrights Horizons in New York City in October of 2018.

After its brief stay in Baltimore, The Thanksgiving Play went back to Portland for a table/room/stage finishing Commission at the Artists Rep. After Portland, there was another workshop in early 2017 at The Playwrights' Center in Minneapolis and a full production in November 2019, at the Geffen Playhouse in Los Angeles, California. An online production starring Bobby Cannavale, Keanu Reeves, Heidi Schreck and Alia Shawkat and directed by Leigh Silverman was produced in March 2021. The text was updated to reflect the new context, with the characters rehearsing the titular play over Zoom. The performance included interstitials directed, designed, and performed by Ty Defoe.

The play was brought to Pittsburgh, Pennsylvania in November 2021 by Arcade Comedy Theater. 

The play will make its Broadway debut at the Hayes Theater in spring 2023 in a production directed by Rachel Chavkin.

Characters 

Casting Note: All ages are open and actors that “look white” may be played by POC passing as white.

Logan

Female, Caucasian looking, the director as well as an actor. Earnest about theater and doing the right thing, but wants everyone to feel part of the collaboration so much that it derails the actual play.

Caden

Male, Caucasian looking, the academic. Teacher in the Los Angeles Unified School System with dramatic aspirations but no clue how things work on stage.

Jaxton

Male, Caucasian looking, the LA surfer actor. Politically correct to a fault, a big one. He’s that guy everyone loves, but his logical PC thinking takes weird turns.

Alicia

Female, brunette Caucasian but has looks that would have been cast as ethnic in 1950’s movies. Hot, but not bright. That actress whose every script note ends with her being allocated more lines.

Plot 

The play is a one-act satirical comedy about four white people trying to devise a politically correct First Thanksgiving play for Native American Heritage Month to be done in the schools.
 
The director, Logan, hires a Native American actor to be their cultural compass. As Logan, Jaxton, and Caden defer to her for guidance, it is revealed that she is white and only plays Native American when she isn’t playing other ethnicities. Without the Native voice, these four white people now have to find their way through a crazy thicket of privilege, historical accuracy, and school district rules.

Main ideas 
The Thanksgiving Play aims to provoke thought through the idea of a completely Caucasian cast attempting to create a Thanksgiving play that is respectful and politically correct towards Native Americans. The contradictory nature of this idea is very unusual when considering the fact that this play is written by a Native American playwright. The Thanksgiving Play was Fasthorse’s response to constantly being told her plays couldn’t be produced because they included at least one Indigenous character and theaters thought that they couldn’t find Native American actors for the roles. In response, FastHorse challenged herself to write a play about Native American issues that excluded that casting difficulty; enter The Thanksgiving Play.  Here, Fasthorse's characters are white people trying to write and produce a play about Native Americans with no input from them. The hyper-political correctness of the protagonists in this play is meant to touch on how complex and ultimately impossible it is to accomplish that task. It highlights issues such as the lack of casting of indigenous actors, erroneous attempts to represent indigenous people in American society, assumptions about Native American identity rather than tribal (national) identity, and various other problems indigenous people face in America.

Portraying the conflict of trying to form a politically correct Thanksgiving play without Native Americans allows the play to take on an amusing satirical tone as it discusses important issues concerning Native Americans in American society. Underneath the humor and satire in the play, the protagonists subtly bring ways that Americans in the past and even today have inaccurately portrayed Native Americans. In particular, the protagonists continually reference the ways they could portray Native Americans through an all-white cast wearing redface.

Playwright 
FastHorse is a Native American playwright, director, and choreographer who has written and produced numerous contributions to Native American drama, plays involving issues with indigenous people in American society and issues in theater. She is originally from South Dakota and is an enrolled member of the Rosebud Sioux Tribe, Lakota Nation. She began as a ballet dancer, but after an injury, always loving to write, she started working in TV and film as a TV executive and writer. While she achieved some success in the TV world, FastHorse preferred the collaboration of the theater world. Her play Average Family was commissioned and produced at Children’s Theatre Company of Minneapolis and she has been writing for the theatre ever since. FastHorse is currently a member of the Playwright’s Union and on Theatre Communications Group board of directors. She and Ty Defoe also have a consulting company, Indigenous Direction and she is a part of Native Voices at the Autry Museum.

As of 2016, Fasthorse worked on a one-act commission with The Eagle Project in New York City. She also workshopped What Would CrazyHorse Do? with Kansas City Rep with a production in May 2017.

References 

2015 plays
American plays
Native American drama